The men's individual skating event was held as part of the figure skating at the 1932 Winter Olympics. It was the fifth appearance of the event, which had previously been held twice at the Summer Olympics in 1908 and 1920 as well as at the Winter Games in 1924 and 1928. The competition was held on Monday 8 February and on Tuesday 9 February 1932. Twelve figure skaters from eight nations competed.

Results
After three consecutive wins Gillis Grafström finished in second place; making him the most successful Olympic figure skater ever. The Austrian Karl Schäfer was able to beat the Swedish champion and went on to defend his title in 1936.

Referee:
  Joel B. Liberman

Judges:
  Yngvar Bryn
  Herbert J. Clarke
  Hans Grünauer
  Walter Jakobsson
  J. Cecil McDougall
  Jenő Minnich
  Charles M. Rotch

References

External links
 Official Olympic Report
 sports-reference
 

Figure skating at the 1932 Winter Olympics
1932 in figure skating
Men's events at the 1932 Winter Olympics